The Bâsculița is a left tributary of the river Bâsca in Romania. Its source is in the Buzău Mountains, at the foot of the peak Ciulianoș.

Tributaries

The following rivers are tributaries to the river Bâsculița (from source to mouth):

Left: Tămășoiu, Corâiu, Porcu, Tisa, Izvorul lui Comișel, Izvorul cu Ulii, Izvorul Calului
Right: Izvorul Gropii

References

Rivers of Romania
Rivers of Buzău County